Nushin (also Romanized as Nūshīn; also known as Nūshīn Shar) is a city in, and the capital of, Nazlu District of Urmia County, West Azerbaijan province, Iran. At the 2006 census, its population was 6,731 in 1,626 households. The following census in 2011 counted 7,183 people in 1,961 households. The latest census in 2016 showed a population of 8,380 people in 2,311 households.

References 

Urmia County

Cities in West Azerbaijan Province

Populated places in West Azerbaijan Province

Populated places in Urmia County